Nagar is a village in Shajahanpur upzilla in the Bogra district of Bangladesh. It is situated on the bank of the river of Karotoa. There are 27 hamlets in the village, including  Rajarampur, Polipalash and Boronagar.

References

Populated places in Rajshahi Division
Bogura District